The 1917–18 Trinity Blue and White's basketball team represented Trinity College (later renamed Duke University) during the 1917–18 men's college basketball season. The head coach was Charles Doak, coaching his second season with Trinity. The team finished with an overall record of 10–5.

Schedule

|-

References

Duke Blue Devils men's basketball seasons
Duke
1917 in sports in North Carolina
1918 in sports in North Carolina